Vilas Sarang (Devanagari: विलास सारंग) (1942–2015) is a modernist Indian writer, critic and translator.

Life

Sarang's stories have appeared in the UK, US, Canada and India in journals such as Encounter, The London Magazine, TriQuarterly, The Malahat Review, and also in the anthologies New Writing in India (Penguin), The Penguin Book of Horror Stories and New Directions No. 41. His published books in English include a collection of stories, Fair Tree of the Void, and two novels, In the Land of Enki and The Dinosaur Ship.

Overview of Sarang's work

His Marathi book 'सर्जनशोध आणि लिहिता लेखक' (Pursuit of Creation and Author Engaged in Writing) received an award of Government of Maharashtra in year 2008.

Authorship

In English
 Tandoor Cinders (2008)
 Women in Cages (2006) (also translated in Marathi)
 The Dinosaur Ship (2005)
 A Fair Tree of the Void (1990) (also translated in Marathi)
 Editor of the anthology "Indian English Poetry Since 1950" (1989)
 The Stylistics of Literary Translation (1988)
 A Kind of Silence (1978) (a collection of poetry)
 In the Land of Enki (also translated in Marathi and Hindi)
 Seven Critical Essays

In Marathi
 अक्षरांचा श्रम केला (2000) (literary criticism)
 आतंक (1999)
 मॅनहोलमधला माणूस
 सिसिफस आणि बेलाक्वा (literary criticism)
 सोलेदाद (1975)
 रुद्र
 सर्जनशोध आणि लिहिता लेखक (received an award from the Government of Maharashtra in 2008)
 चिरंतनाचा गंध
 कविता: १९६९-१९८४ (a collection of poetry)
 Essay by Vilas Sarang (in Marathi)

References

External links
The Bilingual Modernism of Vilas Sarang, Caravan
Vilas Sarang: the writer you should have read to understand post-modern Indian literature
Adil Jussawala Obituary for Sarang
Obituary for Vilas Sarang
Outlook Review of Women in Cages
The Hindu review of Another Life
Dilip Chitre on Vilas Sarang in Tehelka
Marathi Article on Enkichya Rajyaat by Vishram Gupte
Sachin Ketkar's blog on Sarang's article on the Age of OBC
Sachin Ketkar's blog on Sarang poetics of fiction
Vilas Sarang's essay Perils of Nativism
 Books Authored by Vilas Sarang
 Books that reference Vilas Sarang
 Literary Encyclopedia Article on Vilas Sarang
 Confessions of A Marathi Writer by Vilas Sarang
The Hindu Book Review of The Women in the Cages
 Commentary on his Marathi book Sarjanshodh aani Lihita Lekhak”

1942 births
2015 deaths
Marathi-language poets
Indian literary critics
Marathi-language writers
People from Uttara Kannada
20th-century Indian writers
Writers from Karnataka
20th-century Indian male writers